Bengali cinema may refer to:

 Cinema of Bangladesh, also called Dhallywood
 Cinema of West Bengal, also called Tollywood